Thomas, Tom or Tommy Griffith may refer to:
Thomas Griffith (actor) (1680-1744), Irish stage actor and theatre manager
Thomas Griffith (Australian politician) (1842–1913), member of the New South Wales Legislative Assembly
Tommy Griffith (1889–1967), American baseball player
Thomas B. Griffith (born 1954), American judge
Thomas D. Griffith, American academic in taxation and tax law
Thomas Ian Griffith (born 1962), American actor, producer, writer and martial artist
Thomas Risely Griffith (1848–?), British colonial official
Thomas Griffith (MP) for Flint Boroughs in the 16th century

See also
Thomas Griffiths (disambiguation)